The Defenders are a set of superhero groups with rotating membership appearing in American comic books published by Marvel Comics. They are usually presented as a "non-team" of individualistic "outsiders" who, in their prior adventures, are known for following their own agendas. The team often battle mystic and supernatural threats.

Its original incarnation was led by Doctor Strange and included Hulk, Namor, and—eventually—Silver Surfer. They first appeared as the Defenders in Marvel Feature #1 (Dec. 1971).

The group had a rotating line-up from 1972 until 1986, with Dr. Strange and the Hulk being usually constant members along with a number of other mainstays such as Valkyrie, Nighthawk, Hellcat, Gargoyle, Beast, the Son of Satan and Luke Cage, and many temporary members. The publication was retitled near the end of the run as The New Defenders but featured none of the original members and only Valkyrie, Beast and the Gargoyle of the former long-term members. The concept was modified in the 1993–95 series Secret Defenders, in which Dr. Strange assembled different teams for each individual mission. The original team was reunited in a short-lived 2001 series by Kurt Busiek and Erik Larsen. In 2005 Marvel published a five-issue miniseries featuring the classic line-up by J. M. DeMatteis, Keith Giffen and Kevin Maguire. In December 2011 writer Matt Fraction and artist Terry Dodson launched a Defenders series with a mixture of classic and new members, which lasted for 12 issues.

A television miniseries The Defenders premiered in 2017 on Netflix, with the team consisting of Daredevil, Jessica Jones, Luke Cage, and Iron Fist.

Publication history
The origin of the Defenders lies in two crossover story arcs by Roy Thomas prior to the official founding of the team. The first, in Doctor Strange #183 (November 1969), Sub-Mariner #22 (February 1970), and The Incredible Hulk #126 (April 1970) occurred due to the Dr. Strange series being canceled in the middle of a story arc, leaving Thomas no choice but to resolve the storyline in other series that he wrote. In the story, Dr. Strange teams with Sub-Mariner and the Hulk to protect the Earth from invasion by Lovecraftian interplanar beings known as the Undying Ones and their leader, the Nameless One. Barbara Norriss, later the host of the Valkyrie, first appears in this story. In the second arc, featured in Sub-Mariner #34–35 (February–March 1971), Namor enlists the aid of the Silver Surfer and the Hulk to stop a potentially devastating weather control experiment, inadvertently freeing a small island nation from a dictator and facing the Avengers under the name of the "Titans Three".

The Defenders first appeared as a feature in Marvel Feature #1 (December 1971), where the founding members gather to battle the alien techno-wizard Yandroth and remain as a team afterward. Editor Stan Lee, wanting to write all of the Silver Surfer's stories personally, had asked other writers not to use the character, and suggested that Thomas use Doctor Strange instead. Thomas has also speculated that Lee came up with the team's name: "The 'Defenders' is far too passive a name for my taste. I prefer more aggressive-sounding names like the 'Avengers' or the 'Invaders,' so Stan probably came up with that one." Due to the popularity of their tryout in Marvel Feature, Marvel soon began publishing The Defenders with Steve Englehart writing and Sal Buscema penciling, while Thomas moved into the editor's seat. Despite Lee's continuing edict on the use of the Silver Surfer, he approved Englehart's pitch to include the Silver Surfer in the story.

Valkyrie was introduced to the team in issue #4 (February 1973). Writer Steve Englehart has stated that he added the Valkyrie to the Defenders "to provide some texture to the group." Englehart wrote "The Avengers–Defenders War" crossover in The Avengers #116–118 (October–December 1973) and The Defenders #9–11 (October–December 1973), leaving The Defenders afterwards because he "didn't want to keep doing two team books at the same time." Len Wein briefly wrote the series and introduced such characters as Alpha the Ultimate Mutant and the Wrecking Crew. Wein also added Nighthawk to the cast because, in his words, doing so "gave me a character to play with who didn't have a whole lot of previous history ... [a] character I could do anything I wanted to without worrying about how it would affect any other titles that character might appear in." He later became the editor for several issues.

Steve Gerber first worked on the characters in Giant-Size Defenders #3 (January 1975) and became the writer of the main title with issue #20 the following month. He wrote the series until issue #41 (November 1976). Part of Gerber's oeuvre was reviving forgotten characters; he brought back three pre-Marvel characters, now organized as the Headmen, as well as the Guardians of the Galaxy. The Defenders met Gerber's Howard the Duck in Marvel Treasury Edition #12 (1976). In 2010, Comics Bulletin ranked Gerber and Sal Buscema's run on The Defenders first on its list of the "Top 10 1970s Marvels". Buscema's long run ended with #41, and he was replaced by Keith Giffen.

Due to Marvel's shuffling of editors-in-chief, a brief run by Gerry Conway abruptly ended in mid-production on issue #45. David Anthony Kraft and Roger Slifer volunteered to write the series, but issue #45 had no written plot, having been drawn by Giffen following a story conference with Conway. Kraft and Slifer were unable to contact either Conway or Giffen, and so had to puzzle out Conway's plot from the unscripted artwork.

David Anthony Kraft's run as writer included "The Scorpio Saga" (issues #46, 48–50) and the "Xenogenesis: Day of the Demons" storyline (issues #58–60). The "Defenders for a Day" storyline in issues #62–64 saw dozens of new applicants attempting to join the Defenders, as well as a number of villains attempting to present themselves as Defenders members in order to confuse the authorities and the public as they commit robberies. Kraft later recalled that reactions to the story's off-beat humor were polarized: "readers were either wildly enthusiastic or absolutely and very utterly appalled." Kraft and artist Ed Hannigan explained some of the Valykrie's backstory in The Defenders #66–68 (December 1978 – February 1979). At Kraft's request, Hannigan helped write issue #67 but found that he could not handle both writing and artwork at once, and so transitioned to being just the series's writer with the following issue.

Steven Grant wrote a conclusion to Steve Gerber's Omega the Unknown series in two issues of The Defenders, at the end of which most of the original series' characters were killed. While Gerber seemed unhappy with Grant's conclusion, it nevertheless tied up the loose ends of the comic series, and is considered "canon" by Marvel.

Writer J. M. DeMatteis took over the series with issue #92. Coming from a background of writing eight-page horror shorts for DC Comics, DeMatteis found it a struggle to adapt to writing a 22-page superhero comic on a monthly basis. He and Mark Gruenwald co-wrote The Defenders #107–109 (May–July 1982), which resolved remaining plot points from the Valkyrie story by Kraft and Hannigan published three years earlier. While working on the series, DeMatteis developed a strong friendship with penciler Don Perlin, who would draw the series for nearly half its run. Perlin later commented, "It turned out to be a real fun book because you got a chance to draw almost every character Marvel had at one time or another." He has also stated that Kim DeMulder, who inked issues #122-144 apart from a few fill-ins, is his preferred inker after himself.

The New Defenders
Suffering from creative burnout on the series, DeMatteis felt a change was needed. As of issue #125, The Defenders was retitled to The New Defenders as the original four members (Doctor Strange, the Silver Surfer, the Hulk, and Namor) are forced to leave the team, in response to an alien prophecy that states that these four, operating as a group, would be responsible for destroying the world.  While The Beast reforms the team as an official superhero team complete with government clearance. The "New Defenders" concept provided a substantial boost to the series's sales, but left DeMatteis in a creative drought, as he realized in retrospect that "...I created a book that was exactly the kind of the thing that I hated to write. I made it into a standard superhero team..."

DeMatteis stayed on for only six issues of The New Defenders before turning it over to writer Peter Gillis, whose run was marked by shorter, more personal stories. Gillis recounted, "I had been working for a while at Marvel, and was constantly pumping for more work, and specifically a series of my own. So when I heard DeMatteis was leaving Defenders, I was in [editor] Carl Potts' office like a shot, and I got the gig."

Though the series remained a modest hit through the Gillis/Perlin run, it was cancelled to make room in Marvel's production schedule for the New Universe line. Perlin recounted that Potts tried to soften the blow by telling him and Gillis the news while treating them to lunch at an Indian restaurant. The final issue was The New Defenders #152. In the final issue, several members (Gargoyle, Moondragon and Valkyrie), plus allies (Andromeda, Manslaughter, Interloper) seemingly die in battle with the Dragon of the Moon controlling Moondragon. The remaining mutant members leave the team to join X-Factor. Gillis has claimed that killing off the other members of the group was a directive from the editorial staff to free up the surviving members for usage in X-Factor, pointing out that he shortly after revived several of these seemingly-deceased members in issues of Solo Avengers, in Strange Tales vol. 2 #5–7, followed by issues #3–4 of the relaunched Doctor Strange, Sorcerer Supreme series.

The Return of the Defenders
In 1990, the original trio reunited in The Incredible Hulk #370–371, in which it was revealed that the prophecy was a hoax. The originals then rejoined with the Silver Surfer in a story entitled The Return of the Defenders running in The Incredible Hulk Annual #18, Namor the Sub-Mariner Annual #2, Silver Surfer Annual #5, and Dr. Strange, Sorcerer Supreme Annual #2.

Secret Defenders
In 1993, Marvel sought to revive the "Defenders" brand as "The Secret Defenders". The new team first appeared, unofficially, in Dr. Strange #50 and later Fantastic Four #374, before being officially introduced in Secret Defenders #1. The series' premise originally was that Doctor Strange would organize various teams of heroes for certain missions, with him as the leader. Members included Wolverine, Darkhawk, Spider-Woman, Spider-Man, Hulk, Ghost Rider, and others. This lasted for the first several months of the title, before Doctor Strange was removed from the book, due to the character being reassigned to the "Midnight Sons" line at Marvel. After an arc where the supervillain Thanos organized a team of "Secret Defenders" for a mission, leadership of the Secret Defenders passed to Doctor Druid and the series itself abandoned the revolving-door roster in favor of Druid and the Cognoscenti. The series was canceled with Secret Defenders #25.

Reunion and The Order
In 2001–02, the Defenders reunited in Defenders (vol. 2) #1–12 created by Kurt Busiek and Erik Larsen, immediately followed by The Order #1–6, in which Yandroth manipulated Gaea into "cursing" the primary four Defenders (Doctor Strange, the Sub-Mariner, the Hulk, and the Silver Surfer) so that they would be summoned to major crisis situations. These members were then mind controlled by Yandroth into forming the world-dominating "Order"; once the Order were freed from this control by their fellow heroes (including their teammates Hellcat, Nighthawk, and Valkyrie), the Defenders apparently disbanded. A fill-in issue set between these two series was published in 2011.

2005 miniseries
A Defenders five-issue miniseries debuted in July 2005, by Keith Giffen, J. M. DeMatteis, and Kevin Maguire (as a team, best known for their work on DC's Justice League franchise), featuring Doctor Strange attempting to reunite the original four Defenders to battle Dormammu and Umar. This series focuses mostly on humor as the characters spend most of their time arguing with and criticizing one another. The series was later collected into both hardcover and trade paperback collections, entitled Defenders: Indefensible.

The Last Defenders
In 2008, Joe Casey wrote a new miniseries with a new line-up of Defenders as a result of the Super-Human Registration Act and the events of the Civil War. Nighthawk wanted a team made up of previous Defenders such as Hellcat and Devil Slayer but Tony Stark (Iron Man) makes the decision to select other heroes for the team. The line-up is led by Nighthawk, with Blazing Skull, Colossus, and She-Hulk as members. The Defenders are assigned to New Jersey under the Fifty State Initiative, because the proximity to New York City demands more experienced heroes than can just be recruited from the ranks of Camp Hammond. The team is disbanded for incompetence but Richmond eventually founds a team outside the Initiative with the Son of Satan, She-Hulk, Krang, and Nighthawk (S.H.I.E.L.D. agent Joaquin Pennyworth). The team reappears in the mini-series Vengeance (2011).

The Offenders
In the 2009 ongoing Hulk series (Issues #10–12), Red Hulk assembles a counter team of supervillains called the Offenders, which includes Baron Mordo, Terrax the Tamer, and Tiger Shark, and fights past versions of their enemies.

Fear Itself: The Deep
During the 2011 "Fear Itself" storyline, Doctor Strange forms a new version of the Defenders with Lyra (daughter of Hulk), Namor, Loa (a student of the X-Men), and the Silver Surfer to confront Attuma who has become Nerkkod, Breaker of Oceans. Many past Defenders appear in the last issue.

2011 series
Marvel launched a new Defenders series in December 2011, written by Matt Fraction and drawn by Terry Dodson. The new book features Doctor Strange, Red She-Hulk, Namor, the Silver Surfer and Iron Fist. The new series follows the reunion of the Defenders in Fear Itself: The Deep. During the battle against the Death Celestials the characters Black Cat, Nick Fury, and Ant-Man join the team. The series was cancelled at issue #12. Despite the prophecy supposedly being a hoax, the central storyline of the series involves a reunion of the original four Defenders setting off a chain of events leading to the destruction of the universe. In the final issue, Dr. Strange changes the past so that the reunion never happens, thus erasing all the events of the series.

The Fearless Defenders

February 2013 saw the debut of The Fearless Defenders, a series written by Cullen Bunn with artwork by Will Sliney. Bunn said that he had wanted to write the series, which centers on a new team of Valkyrior, led by Valkyrie and Misty Knight, after writing Fear Itself: The Fearless. It was suggested to him that it should run as a Defenders title, however Bunn explained that beyond the name there is "little connection" to the Defenders.

2017 series

In August 2017, Marvel launched a new Defenders comic book series starring Daredevil, Jessica Jones, Luke Cage and Iron Fist, based on the Netflix incarnation of the team.

During the "Secret Empire" storyline, the Defenders were seen fighting the villains that were on a rampage for what happened in Pleasant Hill. They were defeated when Nitro exploded.

The Best Defense
2018 saw a new five part crossover storyline involving the "Big Four" members of the team. Published throughout December, the plot features separate issues all sub-titled "The Best Defense" in Immortal Hulk, Namor, Doctor Strange and Silver Surfer which culminates in a final issue under the banner of The Defenders. Announced on August 24, 2018, the creative teams were respectively:
Immortal Hulk written by Al Ewing and illustrated by Simone Di Meo
Namor written by Chip Zdarsky and illustrated by Carlos Magno
Doctor Strange written by Gerry Duggan and illustrated by Greg Smallwood
Silver Surfer written and illustrated by Jason Latour
The Defenders written by Al Ewing and illustrated by Joe Bennet.

2021 series
In August 2021, Marvel launched a new Defenders series. Written by Al Ewing with art by Javier Rodriguez, this new version of the team features Doctor Strange, Silver Surfer, Masked Raider, Red Harpy and Cloud.

Defenders: Beyond
Before the publication of the fifth and final issue of the 2021 series it was teased that the team would be returning after a short break in summer 2022 for another five part run. Following a message from beyond the grave from Doctor Strange, a new team is assembled featuring Blue Marvel, America Chavez, Taaia (the mother of Galactus), Tigra, and Loki (a variant of the God of Mischief) to tackle a new cosmic threat.

Membership

Defenders membership was fluid, yet a few members were relatively constant: the three founders (Doctor Strange, Namor the Sub-Mariner, and the Hulk), the Silver Surfer, the Valkyrie, Nighthawk, the Hellcat, and the Gargoyle. Membership was clearer in the New Defenders era when the team was more formally organized.

Secret Defenders
This group's composition was even more fluid than that of the original Defenders, but typically included either Doctor Strange or Doctor Druid as leader, joined by a custom selection of heroes chosen for the mission at hand. At various times, War Machine, Darkhawk, Thunderstrike, Wolverine, the second Spider-Woman, Ant-Man, Iceman, Nomad, and many others were members. At the end of its existence, the group had a somewhat regular composition, including Cadaver, Sepulchre, Joshua Pryce, and Doctor Druid.

Other versions

Ultimate Marvel

In the Ultimate Marvel universe, the Defenders are a group of amateur vigilantes who dress up as superheroes. None of them have superpowers, although they claim to be experienced in crimefighting. Henry Pym is invited to join them, and he accepts, adopting a new identity, Ant-Man, to avoid the potential legal problems of using his growth serum, as it has become the official property of the government. Their members include Ultimate versions of Power Man, Hellcat, Nighthawk, Valkyrie, Black Knight, Son of Satan and Whiz-Kid. The Ultimate Defenders are much more interested in becoming celebrities rather than actually stopping crimes or saving lives.

Since The Ultimates (vol. 3), Pym has rejoined the Ultimates, and the Valkyrie was rewritten as having powers and skills akin to her Earth-616 counterpart, along with expertise in sword fighting, some degree of enhanced strength, and training by Thor.

The Defenders return in Ultimate Comics: New Ultimates #1 (May 2010) with the original members now possessing superhuman abilities that fit their namesakes. It is revealed that Loki gave them these powers (Valkyrie included), to steal Thor's enchanted hammer Mjolnir.

"Age of Ultron"
Following Wolverine's murder of Hank Pym during the Age of Ultron to keep Ultron from being created, a splinter timeline called Earth-26111 is created. In the new timeline, the Defenders became the world's premier superhero team after the disbanding of the Avengers. The new Defenders line-up consisted of Doctor Strange, Captain America, Wolverine, Janet Van Dyne as Captain Marvel, Thing, Scott Summers as Cable, Hulk, and Star-Lord. The group is a resistance against Morgan le Fay who has conquered half of Earth.

"Iron Man: Fatal Frontier"
In the Iron Man: Fatal Frontier storyline taking place on Earth-10429, a version of the Defenders consisting of Captain America, the Hulk, and Thor encountered Rescue, this reality's version of Ho Yinsen. After a brief fight over a misunderstanding, Rescue joins up with the Defenders.

Secret Wars (2015)
During the "Secret Wars" storyline, different versions of the Defenders are featured:

 A variation of the Defenders resides in the Battleworld domain of 2099. Vision 2099 experiences a premonition of a group of enemies called the Defenders who he predicts will attack the Avengers. The Defenders 2099 are later revealed to consist of Silver Surfer, Strange, Valkyrie, Roman the Sub-Mariner, and Hulk 2099. Following the defeat of the Dweller-In-Darkness, Miguel Stone allowed the Defenders to continue operating independently.
 The Yinsen City region of Battleworld is protected by a variation of the Defenders. The team is led by Captain Britain (Faiza Hussain) and consists of She-Hulk, White Tiger, Kid Rescue (the armored version of Ho Yinsen's granddaughter Toni), and Spider Hero (that world's version of Hobie Brown).

In other media

Television

 The Defenders appear in The Super Hero Squad Show episode "Invader From the Dark Dimension!". When Baron Mordo possesses Iron Man, Wolverine, Falcon, and Redwing, a new group is formed by Doctor Strange, Valkyrie, the Hulk, Thor, and the Silver Surfer to stop Mordo.
 A variation of the Defenders appears in the Avengers Assemble episode "Planet Doom". This version serves as the world's sole team of heroes in an alternate timeline where Doctor Doom prevented the formation of the Avengers and took over the world. The team consists of Clint Barton / Bullseye, Sam Wilson / Snap, Peter Parker / Slinger, and Frank Castle, with Natasha Romanoff / Black Bride and the Brain Trust (Tony Stark and Bruce Banner) as moles in Doctor Doom's forces.

 A live-action, eight episode miniseries called The Defenders aired on Netflix during the summer of 2017. Set in the Marvel Cinematic Universe (MCU), it served as the culmination of storylines from the live-action series Daredevil, Jessica Jones, Luke Cage and Iron Fist, with Charlie Cox, Krysten Ritter, Mike Colter, and Finn Jones reprising their respective title roles. Douglas Petrie and Marco Ramirez served as the showrunners and Drew Goddard was the executive producer of the show. The show revolved around the team organizing to fight the Hand.

Video games
 The Defenders appear in Marvel Avengers Academy, consisting of Colleen Wing, Daredevil, Hellcat, Iron Fist, Jessica Jones, Luke Cage, and Misty Knight.
 The Defenders appear in Marvel Ultimate Alliance 3: The Black Order, consisting of Daredevil, Luke Cage, Iron Fist, and Elektra as playable characters and Jessica Jones as a non-playable character.

Homages
The Justice League two-part episode "The Terror Beyond" features Doctor Fate, Aquaman, Solomon Grundy, and Hawkgirl banding together to fight an ancient supernatural entity called Icthulhu. According to Bruce Timm, the team was meant to be an explicit homage to the Defenders, with each member paralleling a different Marvel hero (Doctor Fate / Doctor Strange, Aquaman / Namor, Solomon Grundy / Hulk, and Hawkgirl / Nighthawk). This homage is taken further in the Justice League Unlimited episode "Wake the Dead", wherein Amazo joins the group as an apparent analogue of the Silver Surfer.

Collected editions

Marvel Masterworks Defenders

Defenders Omnibus

Essential Defenders

Marvel Epic collections

Other Volume One collected editions

The Secret Defenders

Defenders volume 3

The Last Defenders

The Defenders by Matt Fraction (volume 4)

The Fearless Defenders

The Defenders by Brian Michael Bendis (volume 5)

The Best Defense

Defenders by Al Ewing (volume 6)

Other

References

External links
 Milne, D.T. The Defenders: A Complete History of the Marvel Comics' Super-Hero Team
 Hatcher, Greg. "Trapped in a Friday He Never Made: Essay on Gerber's Omega and The Defenders," Comic Book Resources (Aug. 5, 2006).
 Latta, D.K. "Who Remembers Scorpio?," The Masked Bookwyrm. Discussion of the "Scorpio Saga" story-arc.

1972 comics debuts
Marvel Comics American superheroes
Characters created by Roy Thomas
Comics adapted into television series
Comics by Brian Michael Bendis
Comics by Gerry Conway
Comics by J. M. DeMatteis
Comics by Keith Giffen
Comics by Kurt Busiek
Comics by Len Wein
Comics by Roy Thomas
Comics by Steve Englehart
Comics by Steve Gerber
Comics set in New York City
Comics characters introduced in 1971
Marvel Comics superhero teams
Marvel Comics titles